Anelia Ralenkova (born December 25, 1963) became one of Bulgaria's most distinctive rhythmic gymnasts. She is one of the "Golden Girls" of Bulgaria that dominated rhythmic gymnastics in the 1980s.

Biography 
She won gold medals at both world and European championships, but missed competing at the Summer Olympics in 1984 due to the Soviet-led boycott. Her coaches were Zlatka Boneva and Neshka Robeva.

The 1982 European Championships were also successful for Ralenkova, who placed first in the all-around and with rope and hoop, and second with clubs. But at the 1983 World Championships, Ralenkova fumbled with ribbon and was defeated by teammate Diliana Gueorguieva. Ralenkova shared the silver medal with another teammate, Lilia Ignatova, and Soviet Galina Beloglazova. Ralenkova won a collection of medals in event finals but was just edged out of every title except hoop (she also earned bronze for ball, clubs, and ribbon).

Ralenkova tied Soviet Galina Beloglazova for the all-around title at the 1984 European Championships, a result she strongly contested but finished the Individual competition finals with golds for hoop, ball, and clubs and a bronze for ribbon.

In 1990, the U.S. Gymnastics Federation invited Ralenkova to do clinics, workshops, and sports promotions in a 35-city tour across the U.S.

References

External links
 
 Bulgarian sport profile

1964 births
Living people
Bulgarian rhythmic gymnasts
Gymnasts from Sofia
Sportspeople from Redmond, Washington
Bulgarian emigrants to the United States
Medalists at the Rhythmic Gymnastics World Championships